Weisenberg Township is a township in Lehigh County, Pennsylvania. The population of Weisenberg Township was 4,923 at the 2010 U.S. census. The township is a suburb of Allentown in the Lehigh Valley, which had a population of 861,899 and was the 68th most populous metropolitan area in the U.S. as of the 2020 census.

Geography
It is in the Delaware River watershed and is drained by tributaries of Jordan Creek into the Lehigh River to the east and by tributaries of Maiden Creek into the Schuylkill River to the southwest.

It includes the villages of Haafsville, Hymensville, New Smithville, Seiberlingville, Seipstown, Stines Corner, and Werleys Corner.

Adjacent municipalities
Lynn Township (northwest)
Heidelberg Township (tangent to the north)
Lowhill Township (northeast)
Upper Macungie Township (southeast)
Maxatawny Township (south)
Greenwich Township (southwest)
Albany Township (west)

Climate
The township has a humid continental climate (Dfa/Dfb) and the hardiness zones are 6a and 6b.

Demographics

As of the census of 2000, there were 4,144 people, 1,458 households, and 1,214 families residing in the township.  The population density was 154.5 people per square mile (59.7/km2).  There were 1,514 housing units at an average density of 56.5/sq mi (21.8/km2).  The racial makeup of the township was 98.07% White, 0.53% African American, 0.02% Native American, 0.43% Asian, 0.29% from other races, and 0.65% from two or more races. Hispanic or Latino of any race were 1.25% of the population.

There were 1,458 households, out of which 37.7% had children under the age of 18 living with them, 75.9% were married couples living together, 4.7% had a female householder with no husband present, and 16.7% were non-families. 11.8% of all households were made up of individuals, and 3.8% had someone living alone who was 65 years of age or older.  The average household size was 2.82 and the average family size was 3.09.

In the township, the population was spread out, with 25.9% under the age of 18, 5.7% from 18 to 24, 31.4% from 25 to 44, 27.6% from 45 to 64, and 9.3% who were 65 years of age or older.  The median age was 39 years. For every 100 females, there were 102.1 males.  For every 100 females age 18 and over, there were 99.9 males. The median income for a household in the township was $63,631, and the median income for a family was $70,852. Males had a median income of $45,898 versus $32,656 for females. The per capita income for the township was $27,163.  About 1.8% of families and 2.3% of the population were below the poverty line, including 1.4% of those under age 18 and 4.5% of those age 65 or over.

History
Weisenburg Township was formed out of the "Backparts of Macunjy" and part of the Allemangel, and was established as a township in 1753. Weisenburg was named for the city of Weissenburg (now Wissembourg), a fortress and town in Alsace, from the region in which the majority of the townspeople had come. The first settlements took place in 1734, on and around the highlands in the vicinity of Ziegel Church.

Public education
The township is served by the Northwestern Lehigh School District.

Public safety
Fire protection is provided by the Weisenberg Township Volunteer Fire Department. Emergency medical services are provided by the Cetronia Ambulance Corps, who have a unit stationed at the Weisenberg Township Volunteer Fire Department. Law enforcement is provided by the Pennsylvania State Police.

Transportation

Weisenberg is crossed east-to-west by Interstate 78/U.S. Route 22, which has an interchange with north-to-south Pennsylvania Route 863 in the south.  Other roads of note in the township include Claussville Road, Holbens Valley Road, Lyon Valley Road, Seipstown Valley Road, and Werleys Corner Road/Sweitzer Road.

Notable people
Martin Brechall, former fraktur painter
Daniel Schumacher, former Lutheran pastor and fraktur painter

References

External links

1753 establishments in Pennsylvania
Populated places established in 1753
Townships in Lehigh County, Pennsylvania
Townships in Pennsylvania